The following list is merely a snapshot of brothers who have brought Acacia to prominence. The list of Acacia brothers includes initiated and honorary members of Acacia.

Notable alumni

Politics and government 
 Conrad G Selvig, Minnesota 1906 - US Congressman, Minnesota
 Harry Leslie, Purdue 1907 - Governor of Indiana
 William Jennings Bryan, Nebraska 1908 - Secretary of State under Woodrow Wilson; orator
 William Howard Taft, Yale 1913 - 27th President of the United States of America
 Paul V. McNutt, Harvard 1914 - Governor of Indiana
 David Sholtz, Yale 1914 - Governor of Florida
 Arthur Capper, Kansas State 1916 - Governor and US Senator, Kansas
 Wilburn Cartwright, Oklahoma 1920 - US Congressman, Oklahoma
 Francis H Case, Northwestern 1923 - US Congressman, South Dakota
 Ralph Yarborough, Texas 1926 - US Senator, Texas
 Ovie Clark Fisher, Texas 1926 - US Congressman, Texas; writer
 John Moore Allison, Nebraska 1927 - diplomat; Ambassador to Japan; Assistant Secretary of State under Truman
 William G. Bray, Indiana 1927 - US Congressman, Indiana
 Homer Thornberry, Texas 1930 - US Congressman, Texas
 J. Edward Hutchinson, Michigan 1933 - US Congressman, Michigan
 Frank Carlson, Kansas State 1948 - US Congressman; US Senator; Governor of Kansas
 Homer E. Capehart, Indiana 1959 - US Senator, Indiana
 James 'Jim' Kolbe, Northwestern 1961 - US House Representative, Arizona
 Steve Scalise, LSU 1986 - Current US Congressman, Louisiana
 Jim Watson, Carleton University 1998 - Member of Provincial Parliament (Minister), Mayor of Ottawa, Ontario, Canada (1997–2000) (2010–Present)
Douglas “Dewey” Lachance, University of New Hampshire, 1984-1990, NH Legislator 1987-1991 and 1998-2000, Mayor of Rochester, NH 1997-2001

Sports 
 Chester L. Brewer, Missouri 1911 - past head football coach at both Missouri and Michigan State; past Athletic Director of Missouri; Homecoming originator
 John L. Griffith, Illinois 1921 - past commissioner of what is now the Big Ten Conference
 Edwin Weir, Nebraska 1925 - Hall of Fame college football player
 Jack van Bebber, Oklahoma State 1931 - Olympic wrestler
 Calvin Griffith, George Washington 1935 - owner of Washington Senators / Minnesota Twins
 Arthur L. Valpey, Michigan 1936 - head football coach of Harvard and UConn
 Thomas "Tommy" James, Ohio State 1942 - professional football player, Cleveland Browns
 Dee Andros, Oklahoma 1948 - head football coach and athletic director, Oregon State
 Gene Conley, Washington State 1949 - professional baseball player and basketball player
 Roger Nelson, Oklahoma 1951 - Canadian Football Hall of Fame
 Richard ‘Dick’ Farley, Indiana 1951 - star IU basketball player for the 1953 National Championship team; NBA player
 David 'Wes' Santee, Kansas 1952 - Olympic runner
 Ron Fairly, USC 1957 - professional baseball player and broadcaster
 Tony Crosby, Texas 1963 - star kicker/halfback for UT's 1963 National Championship football team
 Pat Jones, Oklahoma State -  Head Football Coach at Oklahoma State; Assistant Coach of Miami Dolphins
 Gary Patterson, Kansas State 1980 -  current Head Football Coach at TCU

Business 
 Lewis H Wentz, Oklahoma 1927 - oil businessman
 Dennis Chookaszian, Northwestern 1962 - Chairman and CEO of CNA Insurance Companies; professor at University of Chicago Booth School of Business
 David A. Evans, Rensselaer 1979 - inventor of high capacity tantalum capacitor; President of Evans Capacitor Company

Higher education 
 Roscoe Pound, Nebraska 1905, Harvard 1913 - educator; Bushnell Hall at KSU dedicated in his name
 Albert B Storms, Iowa State 1909 - President of Iowa State University
 Walter Williams, Missouri 1909 - President of University of Missouri; founder of Missouri School of Journalism
 Raymond A. Pearson, Iowa State 1924 - President of Iowa State University
 Stratton D Brooks, Missouri 1925 - President of University of Oklahoma (1912) and University of Missouri (1923)
 Claude R. Sowle, Northwestern 1947 - past President of Ohio University
 L. Dennis Smith, Indiana 1956 - President Emeritus, University of Nebraska
 J Thomas Forbes, Indiana 1990 - CEO, IU Alumni Association at Indiana University

Science 
 William F. Durand, Stanford 1904 - NASA pioneer
 Wallace E Pratt, Kansas 1907- pioneer in the petroleum field
 Alexander Wetmore, Kansas 1912 - ornithologist
 Karl M. Dallenbach, Cornell 1913 - psychologist
 Harold E. Edgerton, Nebraska 1924 - pioneer in the electronic flash, pertaining to photography
 Lloyd Berkner, Minnesota 1926 - physicist
 James E. Webb, North Carolina 1927 - high-ranking NASA official in the 1960s
 Jack Kilby, Illinois 1942 - Nobel Prize laureate in physics; inventor of the integrated circuit
 Laurence H. Snyder, Oklahoma 1949 - pioneer in genetics
 George J. Marrett, Iowa State 1957 - test pilot for USAF and Hughes Aircraft Company; author of four non-fiction books on aviation

Arts and entertainment 
 Arthur H Carhart, Iowa State 1916 - early conservationist and writer
 Edward Everett Dale, Harvard 1917 - historian, writer
 Jack Collom, Colorado A&M 1952 - poet, writer, teacher
 Philip Bobbitt, Texas 1965 - author and constitutional theorist
 Scott Houston, Indiana 1980 - public television personality; public speaker; known as "Piano Guy"
 Mark Edward Smith, Missouri  - actor and vocalist; Avatar and X-Men Origins: Wolverine
 Nic Pizzolatto, LSU - creator and writer of the TV series True Detective

Miscellaneous or multiple 
 Walter Elmer Ekblaw, Illinois 1907 - originator of "Homecoming"
 Hiram Bingham III, Yale 1915 - explorer; discovered Machu Picchu; US Senator
 H. L. 'Tom' Sebring, Kansas State 1920 - judge for the Nuremberg Trials; head football coach at the University of Florida
 Clifton Hillegass, Nebraska 1938 - creator of CliffsNotes
 Frank S. Land, Missouri - founder of DeMolay'

References

External links
Acacia Fraternity official website: notable alumni

Lists of members of United States student societies
brothers